The Tsurugi class is a class of small patrol vessel of the Japan Coast Guard (JCG).  The development of this class was one of the earliest attempts of the JCG to deal with spy boats from North Korea. In March 1999, the JCG tried to intercept vessels of unknown nationality suspected to be North Korean, but the unknown vessels were too fast, and the Japan Maritime Self-Defense Force had to be called to intercept the unknown vessels. As a consequence of this failure, JCG realized their need for high speed interceptors.

Planned as the top-tier of JCG intercept spy boats, this class features very high speed and accurate firepower. Its weaponry includes a JM61 20 mm Gatling gun, and a Remote Firing System consisting of a remote weapon system with a laser-optical fire-control system.

In the Battle of Amami-Ōshima, the combination of the 20 mm gun with the RFS proved its worth, but it became clear that its effective range was insufficient against weapons on board the North Korean spy boats such as 9K38 Igla MANPADS and B-10 recoilless rifle.

Ships in the class

See also
 List of Japan Coast Guard vessels and aircraft

References

Future reading
 
 
 

Patrol vessels of the Japan Coast Guard
Patrol boat classes